Hideout may refer to:

Entertainment
 Hideout (film), a 1949 American thriller film directed by Philip Ford
 The Hideout (1956 film), a 1956 British crime film directed by Peter Graham Scott
 The Hideout (film), a 2007 film by Pupi Avati
 Hideout (album), a 2008 album by Film School
 Hideout (manga), a 2010 psychological horror manga by Kakizaki Masasumi
 Hideout (novel), a 2013 novel by Gordon Korman
 Hideout Festival, an electronic music festival held in Zrce, Croatia

Places
 Hideout, Utah, a town in Wasatch County, Utah, United States
 The Hideout, Pennsylvania, a private community in Wayne County, Pennsylvania, United States
 The Hideout Golf Club, a public golf course in Monticello, Utah, United States
 The Hideout Inn, a bar and music venue in Chicago, Illinois, United States

See also